The Himyarite Kingdom was a kingdom in ancient Yemen.

Himyar may also refer to:

Himyar (horse), an American thoroughbred racehorse
Himyar, Kentucky, a community in Knox County, Kentucky